Makamaka Rural LLG is a local-level government (LLG) of Milne Bay Province, Papua New Guinea.

Wards
01. Bai'awa
02. Midino
03. Iarame
04. Pem
05. Magabara
06. Tapio
07. Mukawa
08. Bogaboga
09. Ginada
10. Irikaba
11. Wabubu
12. Dabora
13. Banapa
14. Menapi
15. Pora
16. Abuaro
17. Giwa
18. Koiyabagira
19. Kwagila
20. Biniguni
21. Wapon
22. Borovia
23. Pumani
24. Bemberi
25. Gurukwaia
26. Mapouna

References

Local-level governments of Milne Bay Province